Silicon tetraiodide is the chemical compound with the formula SiI4.  It is a tetrahedral molecule with Si-I bond lengths of 2.432(5) Å.

SiI4 is a precursor to silicon amides of the formula Si(NR2)4 (R = alkyl). It has also been of interest in the manufacture and etching of silicon in microelectronics.

Reactions
This compound is stable among strong heating. It can be stored at room temperature for long periods but must be kept dry because it reacts quickly with water and moisture in the air.
It can be made on a large scale by reaction of silicon or silicon carbide with iodine on heating to about 200 °C. Of more academic interest is the reaction of silane with iodine vapour at 130 - 150 °C, as this produces a series of compounds ranging from iodosilane SiH3I to diiodosilane SiH2I2 and triiodosilane SiHI3 as well. These compounds are colourless liquids at room temperature. The last one can be readily distinguished from the similar carbon compound, iodoform which is a yellow solid at room temperature.

Comparison with other SiX4 compounds

References

External links
 webelements page

Iodides
Inorganic silicon compounds
Nonmetal halides